is a train station in Kashiwara, Osaka Prefecture, Japan.

Line
Kintetsu Railway
Osaka Line

Layout
The station has two side platforms on the ground, serving one track each.

The ticket gate is only one place. The length of the platform is 6 cars (120 meter)

Adjacent stations

Railway stations in Japan opened in 1927
Railway stations in Osaka Prefecture